Basel is a city in Switzerland.

Basel may also refer to:
Basel (canton), a historical Swiss canton, now divided into two half-cantons:
Basel-Landschaft
Basel-Stadt
FC Basel, football (soccer) club based in Basel, Switzerland
PS Basel, Indonesian football club based in Bangka Selatan (Basel), Bangka Belitung Islands
Roman Catholic Diocese of Basel

People
Alfred Basel, Austrian painter 
Edgar Basel, German boxer
Marzia Basel (born 1968), Afghan judge
Basel Manadil (popularly known as The Hungry Syrian Wanderer), Syrian blogger

See also
Basel Committee on Banking Supervision (BCBS), an international banking regulatory body
Basel Accords
Basel I, the first (1988) accord on banking capital
Basel II, the second (2004) accord on banking capital
Basel III, the anticipated third accord on banking capital
Basel Convention, a treaty to reduce the movements of hazardous waste between nations
Basel problem, a famous problem in number theory
Basil, a plant and culinary herb
Basil (name), of which Basel is a variant
Basal (disambiguation), referring to a base or minimum level
Basell Polyolefins

German toponymic surnames